Singapore competed at the 1972 Summer Olympics in Munich, West Germany.

Results by event

Athletics
Men's 100 metres
 Yeo Kian Chye
 Heat Two — 10.92s (→ did not advance)

Men's 200 metres
 Yeo Kian Chye
 Heat Two — 21.89s (→ did not advance)

Men's 5000 metres
 P. C. Suppiah
 Heat One— 15:36.6 (→ did not advance)

Men's 10,000 metres
 P. C. Suppiah
 Heat One— 31:59.2 (→ did not advance)

Men's High Jump
 Nor Azhar Hamid
 Qualification Round — 2.00m (→ did not advance)

Boxing
Men's Light-Flyweight
 Syed Abdul Kadir

Swimming
Men's 100 metres Butterfly
 Roy Kum Wah Chan

Men's 200 metres Butterfly
 Roy Kum Wah Chan

Men's 200 metres Individual Medley
 Roy Kum Wah Chan

Women's 100 metres Backstroke
 Patricia Li Yin Chan

Women's 100 metres Butterfly
 Tay Chin Joo

Women's 200 metres Backstroke
 Patricia Li Yin Chan

References

Sources
 
 
 

Nations at the 1972 Summer Olympics
1972
1972 in Singaporean sport